Hebius sauteri, commonly known as Sauter's keelback or the Kosempo keelback, is a species of snake in the family Colubridae. The species is endemic to Asia.

Etymology
The specific name, sauteri, is in honor of German entomologist Hans Sauter.

Geographic range
H. sauteri is found in southern China, Taiwan, and northern Vietnam.

Habitat

Reproduction
H. sauteri is oviparous.

References

Further reading
Boulenger GA (1909). "Descriptions of Four new Frogs and a new Snake discovered by Mr. H. Sauter in Formosa". Annals and Magazine of Natural History, Eighth Series 4: 492–495. (Tropidonotus sauteri, new species, p. 495).
Guo P, Zhu F, Liu Q, Zhang L, Li JX, Huang YY, Pyron RA (2014). "A taxonomic revision of the Asian keelback snakes, genus Amphiesma (Serpentes: Colubridae: Natricinae), with description of a new species". Zootaxa 3873 (4): 425–440. (Hebius sauteri, new combination).
Smith MA (1943). The Fauna of British India, Ceylon and Burma, Including the Whole of the Indo-Chinese Sub-region. Reptilia and Amphibia. Vol. III.—Serpentes. London: Secretary of State for India. (Taylor and Francis, printers). xii + 583 pp. (Natrix sauteri, p. 287).

Reptiles described in 1909
Reptiles of China
sauteri
Taxa named by George Albert Boulenger
Reptiles of Taiwan
Reptiles of Vietnam